Hand Over Fist is a collaborative album by Minnesota rapper Mike Mictlan and hip hop producer Lazerbeak, both members of Minneapolis hip hop collective Doomtree. The album was released on Doomtree Records on October 14, 2008.

Music 
Hand Over Fist is entirely produced by Doomtree producer Lazerbeak. The album included one feature total from fellow Doomtree member P.O.S.

Track listing

References

External links 
 

2009 albums
Doomtree Records albums
Albums produced by Lazerbeak
Hip hop albums by American artists